Oopsidius is a genus of beetles in the family Cerambycidae, containing the following species:

 Oopsidius cetus Dillon & Dillon, 1952
 Oopsidius pictus Breuning, 1939

References

Apomecynini